The PDC Order of Merit is a world ranking system used by one of the darts organisations, the Professional Darts Corporation (PDC). Following the 2007 PDC World Darts Championship it superseded a world ranking system based on points being awarded for performances in ranking tournaments.

How it works
The Order of Merit is similar to that employed in golf's European Tour. Prize money won during the previous two seasons is calculated and the rankings are determined from this money list.
The Professional Darts Corporation adopted an Order of Merit system in 2007, which is based on prize money won over two years for the main Order of Merit and separate one-year rankings for other PDC Pro Tour events.

PDC Top 64 Order of Merit

Secondary Orders of Merit

In addition to the main two-year Order of Merit, the PDC also operates secondary Orders of Merit for their different tours. These include the:
 ProTour Order of Merit, which counts money earned in Players Championships and European Tour events over a 12 month rolling period. In addition to qualification for televised tournaments, this ranking determines the seedings for Pro Tour events.
 European Tour Order of Merit, which counts money earned in European Tour events during the calendar year. The top 32 on this ranking list comprise the qualifiers for the European Championship, all seeded, at the end of the year.
 Players Championship Order of Merit, which counts money earned in Player Championship events during the calendar year. The top 64 on this ranking list are the seeded qualifiers to the Players Championship Finals.
 Challenge Tour Order of Merit, which counts money earned on the Challenge Tour (by non Tour Card holders that participated in Q-School) during the calendar year. The top players at the end of the year qualify for the World Championship, UK Open, and receive Tour Cards.
 Development Tour Order of Merit, which counts money earned on the Development Tour (by Tour Card holders and non Tour Card holders alike, aged 16–23) during the calendar year. The top players at the end of the year qualify for the World Championship, UK Open, and receive Tour Cards.
 Women's Series Order of Merit, which was introduced in 2021 after the first women's series events were introduced in 2020. The tournament series qualifies two women to the Grand Slam, and World Championship.

Player exemptions and seedings
The PDC rankings from all orders of merit determine exemptions from the qualifying competitions and seedings for all televised events. Additionally, the orders of merit are used to offer tour cards for the following year.

Ranking Tournaments
The PDC holds a variety of ranked and unranked televised tournaments throughout the year. There are an additional selection of ranked floor and streamed tournaments that comprise the PDC Pro Tour, as well as unranked secondary tours and events such as the Challenge Tour, Development Tour, and event qualifiers. Money earned in all ranking events counts toward the Order of Merit, with none counting from the unranked events.

Unranked Tournaments

The PDC operates additional unranked tournaments for tour card holders and occasional qualifiers throughout the year. This includes five televised premier invitational events comprising the Premier League, Champions League of Darts, World Series of Darts Finals, The Masters, and the World Cup of Darts pairs event. Although none of these events count toward the Order of Merit, they all award some number of tournament spots based on Order of Merit position. Additionally there are usually five to seven World Series of Darts events scheduled across the globe each year with eight top PDC players seeded over eight local qualifiers.

Secondary Tours and Tournaments

The PDC also offers secondary tours that do not count toward the main Order of Merit, but do each include their own confined orders of merit. The Challenge Tour is open to any players who played at the most recent Q-School but failed to earn a tour card. Throughout the year, the top players on the Challenge Tour OoM are invited to fill openings on the Pro Tour, receive invitations to the World Championship and UK Open, and at the end of the year receive tour cards for the next two years. 

The Development Tour is open to players outside of the top 32 on the main Order of Merit who are between the ages of 16 and 23. Similarly to the Challenge Tour, the top players on the Development Tour order of merit receive tour cards and invitations to the UK Open and World Championship. Additionally, 96 players - comprising 16 invitations, tour card holders of the appropriate age, and Development Tour competitors - partake in the World Youth Championship. Although this championship does not count toward any order of merit, there is a £60,000 payout, and the finalists receive tour cards as well as berths in the Grand Slam and World Championship.

Previous world ranking system
Under the previous ranking points system, Colin Lloyd was the world number one player in the PDC for most of 2005 and 2006, despite most of the major titles being shared between Phil Taylor, Raymond van Barneveld and John Part. Although Lloyd also won two major titles, he often accumulated ranking points in the less prestigious non-televised events, in which Taylor did not always compete. Similarly, Alan Warriner was world number one on four occasions before ever winning his first and only PDC major, the 2001 Grand Prix, while Taylor won eight world championships and a host of other titles during that period.

Previous World Number Ones
 PDC Ranking Leaders Timeline
12 players have held the position of World Number One since the World Darts Council started new rankings in 1993. Only Phil Taylor, Raymond van Barneveld, Michael van Gerwen, Gerwyn Price, Peter Wright and Michael Smith have held the position since the PDC switched to the two-year earnings based Order of Merit system in 2007.

Periods

Key

First WDC/PDC rankings
Following the World Darts Council (now PDC) split from the British Darts Organisation during 1992-94 the WDC drew up its first ranking list in the run-up to its inaugural 1994 World Championship. Mike Gregory and Chris Johns later went back to the BDO set up and Bobby George and many of the non-UK players never competed in the early days of the WDC.

See also
Professional Darts Corporation

References

External links
Official PDC Order of Merit

Darts
Professional Darts Corporation
Lists of darts players
Darts